Reciprocity theorem may refer to:
Quadratic reciprocity, a theorem about modular arithmetic
Cubic reciprocity
Quartic reciprocity
Artin reciprocity
Weil reciprocity for algebraic curves
Frobenius reciprocity theorem for group representations
Stanley's reciprocity theorem for generating functions
Reciprocity (engineering), theorems relating signals and the resulting responses
 including Reciprocity (electrical networks), a theorem relating voltages and currents in a network
Reciprocity (electromagnetism), theorems relating sources and the resulting fields in classical electromagnetism
Tellegen's theorem, a theorem about the transfer function of passive networks
Reciprocity law for Dedekind sums
Betti's theorem in linear elasticity

See also
Reciprocity (disambiguation)